Arik Armstead (born November 15, 1993) is an American football defensive end for the San Francisco 49ers of the National Football League (NFL). He played college football at Oregon and was drafted by the 49ers in the first round of the 2015 NFL Draft.

Early years
Armstead attended Pleasant Grove High School in Elk Grove, California. During his high school career. He had 126 tackles and 7.5 sacks. Armstead was a four-star recruit by Rivals.com and sixth best defensive end in his class. He originally committed to the University of Southern California to play college football, but switched to the University of Oregon. He also played basketball in high school.

College career
Armstead played in all 13 games as a true freshman in 2012, making one start. He finished the 2012 season with 26 tackles and a half-sack. During the spring he joined the Ducks basketball team, where he redshirted his first year. Armstead played in 13 games as a sophomore in 2013, recording 15 tackles and one sack. During the spring he re-joined the basketball team. He played in one game, before quitting to focus on football. Armstead returned to the football team his junior season in 2014.

Professional career

The San Francisco 49ers selected Armstead in the first round (17th overall) in the 2015 NFL Draft. He was the fourth defensive end selected in 2015.

2015 season: Rookie year
Armstead was unable to attend training camp and organized team activities until Oregon's school year had concluded due to the NFL's policy that prohibits rookies joining teams until their year is officially completed. Upon arrival, he was competing for the job as the starting defensive end against Quinton Dial, Darnell Dockett, Glenn Dorsey, and Tank Carradine after it was left vacant due to the retirement of Justin Smith. Head coach Jim Tomsula named him the fifth defensive end on the depth chart to begin the regular season, behind Quinton Dial, Glenn Dorsey, Tank Carradine, and Tony Jerod-Eddie.

Armstead made his NFL debut in the season-opening 20–3 victory against the Minnesota Vikings. During the game, Armstead recorded one tackle for loss.
In Week 3 of the season, Armstead recorded three combined tackles and made his first NFL sack on quarterback Carson Palmer for a four-yard loss during a 47–7 road loss to the Arizona Cardinals.
In Week 11, he collected a season-high six combined tackles in a 29–13 loss at the Seattle Seahawks.
In Week 17, Armstead earned his first NFL start and made a solo tackle during a 19–16 overtime victory over the St. Louis Rams.

Armstead finished his rookie year with 19 combined tackles (14 solo) and two sacks in 16 games played with one game started.

2016 season
The 49ers hired Chip Kelly as their new head coach, who was also Armstead's head coach at Oregon. Armstead competed to be the starting defensive end after Glenn Dorsey was moved to nose tackle. Armstead competed against DeForest Buckner and Quinton Dial. Kelly named Armstead and Dial the starting defensive ends for Week 1.

In the season-opener against the Los Angeles Rams, Armstead recorded his first sack of the season on Case Keenum during the 28–0 shutout win.
In week 6 against the Buffalo Bills, Armstead recorded a strip sack on Tyrod Taylor which was recovered by former college teammate DeForest Buckner during the 45–16 loss.

On November 8, 2016, the 49ers placed Armstead on injured reserve with a left shoulder injury. A week later, he had surgery to repair the injured shoulder.
Armstead finished his second season with 15 combined tackles (nine solo), a forced fumble, and 2.5 sacks in eight games and four starts.

2017 season
During Week 2 against the Seattle Seahawks, Armstead recorded his first and only full sack of the season on Russell Wilson during the 12–9 road loss.
On October 17, 2017, Armstead was placed on injured reserve after suffering a broken hand in Week 6. He finished his third season with 16 combined tackles (eight solo), 1.5 sacks, and a pass deflection in six games.

2018 season
On April 30, 2018, the 49ers picked up the fifth-year option on Armstead's contract.

During Week 3 against the Kansas City Chiefs, Armstead recorded his first sack of the season on Patrick Mahomes during the 38–27 road loss.
In Week 7 against the Los Angeles Rams, Armstead recorded a season high five tackles and sacked Jared Goff once during the 39–10 loss.
In the next game against the Arizona Cardinals, Armstead sacked rookie quarterback Josh Rosen once during the 18–15 road loss.
Armstead finished the season with 48 tackles (33 solo) and three sacks in 16 games and starts.

2019 season

During the season-opener against the Tampa Bay Buccaneers, Armstead recorded his first sack of the season on Jameis Winston during the 31–17 road victory. Two weeks later against the Pittsburgh Steelers, he forced a fumble on James Conner which was recovered by DeForest Buckner late in the fourth quarter to help seal a 24–20 win. During Week 6 against the Los Angeles Rams, Armstead recorded a season high 6 tackles, half a sack on Jared Goff, and recovered a fumble lost by Goff during the 20–7 road victory. In the next game against the Washington Redskins, he sacked Case Keenum once during the 9–0 road victory. With that sack, Armstead set a new single season career high of 3.5 sacks.
The following week against the Carolina Panthers, Armstead sacked Kyle Allen twice during the 51–13 win. Two weeks later against the Seattle Seahawks on Monday Night Football, he sacked Russell Wilson 1.5 times during the 27–24 overtime loss. During Week 12 against the Green Bay Packers on Sunday Night Football, Armstead sacked Aaron Rodgers twice during the 37–8 win.

The 2019 season was a breakout season for Armstead. He recorded 54 tackles (32 solo), a team-leading 10 sacks, two forced fumbles, and a fumble recovery in 16 games and starts. He also ranked second on the 49ers regarding tackles for loss.

Armstead made his playoff debut in the NFC Divisional Round of the playoffs against the Minnesota Vikings.  During the game, Armstead sacked Kirk Cousins once in the 27–10 win. In the NFC Championship Game against the Packers, he sacked Aaron Rodgers once during the 37–20 win. In Super Bowl LIV against the Kansas City Chiefs, Armstead recorded three tackles during the 31–20 loss.

2020 season
On March 16, 2020, Armstead signed a five-year, $85 million contract extension with the 49ers with $48.5 million guaranteed.

During Week 2 against the New York Jets, Armstead recorded his first sack of the season on Sam Darnold during the 31–13 road victory. He was placed on the reserve/COVID-19 list by the team on November 16, 2020, and activated on November 25.

2021 season

On December 7, 2021, Armstead was nominated by the 49ers for the Walter Payton NFL Man of the Year Award.  During Week 18, in the 49ers final game of the regular season, Armstead recorded 2.5 sacks in a 27-24 overtime victory against the Los Angeles Rams. The victory clinched the 49ers' spot in the playoffs that year.  Two weeks later, in the NFC Divisional Round, Armstead sacked Green Bay Packers quarterback Aaron Rodgers twice in a 13-10 victory that sent the 49ers to the NFC Championship Game.

NFL career statistics

Regular season

Postseason

Personal life
Armstead's brother, Armond Armstead, played college football at USC and in the Canadian Football League.

Armstead married his wife Mindy on June 20, 2020.

Armstead played in Chess.com's BlitzChamps, a rapid tournament for NFL players. He finished last in his group behind Larry Fitzgerald and Will Davis, and due to personal reasons, he was not able to play the consolation game. As a result, the players split the $22,500 consolation prize fund equally amongst their charities.

References

External links
Oregon Ducks bio
San Francisco 49ers bio

1993 births
Living people
Players of American football from Sacramento, California
American football defensive tackles
American football defensive ends
Oregon Ducks football players
Oregon Ducks men's basketball players
San Francisco 49ers players
American men's basketball players